Ansdale "Barney" William Henricus (June 22, 1915 – May 7, 2007) was a Ceylonese sportsman and police officer. As a boxer he competed in the 1938 British Empire Games, where he won the gold medal in the featherweight class after winning the final against James Watson from Scotland.

Henricus was born in Colombo and was educated at Royal College, Colombo. He joined the Ceylon Police Force as a Sub Inspector and served for 33 years before retiring as a Chief inspector. He emigrated to the United States in 1988. He died in Escondido, California.

His brothers were Major Basil Henricus, Captain George Henricus of the Ceylon Army, Alan Henricus,a former Lieutenant in the Royal Ceylon Navy and Derrick Henricus.

External links

nctimes.com article "Remembering Ansdale 'Barney' Henricus"
nctimes.com article about his death

1915 births
2007 deaths
Sportspeople from Colombo
Sri Lankan male boxers
Featherweight boxers
Boxers at the 1938 British Empire Games
Commonwealth Games gold medallists for Sri Lanka
Sri Lankan emigrants to the United States
Alumni of Royal College, Colombo
Sri Lankan police officers
Commonwealth Games medallists in boxing
Medallists at the 1938 British Empire Games